Kuştepe is a village in the Samsat District of Adıyaman Province in Turkey. The village had a population of 73 in 2021.

References

Villages in Samsat District
Kurdish settlements in Adıyaman Province